Janel Simone Jorgensen (born May 18, 1971), later known by her married name Janel McArdle, is an American former competition swimmer and butterfly specialist.  As a 17-year-old at the 1988 Summer Olympics in Seoul, South Korea, she won a silver medal as a member of the second-place U.S. team in the women's 4×100-meter medley relay, together with her teammates Beth Barr (backstroke), Tracey McFarlane (breaststroke), and Mary Wayte (freestyle).

Jorgensen received an athletic scholarship to attend Stanford University, where she swam for the Stanford Cardinal swimming and diving team in National Collegiate Athletic Association (NCAA) and Pacific-10 Conference competition.  In 1992–93, she was the recipient of the Honda Sports Award for Swimming and Diving, recognizing her as the outstanding college female swimmer of the year.

Jorgensen is the current COO of Swim Across America, a national non-profit organization that has raised over $100 million for cancer research, prevention and treatment through swimming events all over the United States.

See also
 List of Olympic medalists in swimming (women)
 List of Stanford University people

References

External links
 
 

1971 births
Living people
American female butterfly swimmers
Olympic silver medalists for the United States in swimming
Stanford Cardinal women's swimmers
Swimmers at the 1987 Pan American Games
Swimmers at the 1988 Summer Olympics
Place of birth missing (living people)
Medalists at the 1988 Summer Olympics
Pan American Games gold medalists for the United States
Pan American Games medalists in swimming
Medalists at the 1987 Pan American Games
20th-century American women